Stefan Kälin (born 29 September 1942) is a Swiss former alpine skier who competed in the 1964 Winter Olympics and 1968 Winter Olympics.

External links
 sports-reference.com
 

1942 births
Living people
Swiss male alpine skiers
Olympic alpine skiers of Switzerland
Alpine skiers at the 1964 Winter Olympics
Alpine skiers at the 1968 Winter Olympics
Place of birth missing (living people)
20th-century Swiss people